Jay Santos is a Colombian vocalist and singer of electro house dance music and reggaeton. He is signed to Spain's Blanco y Negro Music record label.

Santos rose to fame when he was featured in the European dance hit "Noche de estrellas" by Spanish DJ and producer Jose De Rico and Dominican singer Henry Mendez. It reached number 5 in the Spanish Singles Chart also charting in France. Based on that success, Jay Santos released his solo hit "Caliente" with chart success in Spain, France and Belgium.

Discography
Solo singles

Featured in

References

21st-century Colombian male singers
Living people
Place of birth missing (living people)
Year of birth missing (living people)